Milley is a :surname.  Notable individuals with this surname include:

 Mark Milley (b. 1958), four star general, Chairman of the United States Joint Chiefs of Staff since 2020
 Norm Milley (b. 1980), Canadian former professional ice hockey player
 Thomas Milley (lived ), for whom Dr Milley's Hospital in Lichfield, UK was named

Like many surnames, Milley also appears as a middle name:
 John Milley Doyle (1781-1856), Anglo-Irish soldier

See also 
 Millie

English-language surnames